Zarzon, also known as Satan of Saturn, is a 1981 fixed shooter arcade game developed and manufactured by SNK and licensed to Taito for North American release. The gameplay is a variation of Space Invaders.

Gameplay 

The goal is to fly a spaceship to Saturn, then destroy as many Satans as possible. Additional bonus points can be accumulated by destroying the comet or attacking dragonflies. An additional spaceship is rewarded if the players score reaches 5,000 or 10,000 points. If the attacking UFOs or enemy rockets are destroyed points will be scored. The game progresses through 4 different screens.

The arcade cabinet has one joystick to move the spaceship left to right and guide the missiles.

Technical details
The game ran on the SNK 6502 arcade system board. Other games that ran on the same hardware include Sasuke vs. Commander (1980), Vanquard (1981) and Fantasy.

Legacy
The Zarzon upright arcade cabinet appeared in the 1983 film Joysticks.

References

External links
Zarzon, 
Zarzon, Satan of Saturn at Coinop.org
MAME Review
FAQ at IGN

1981 video games
Arcade video games
Arcade-only video games
Fixed shooters
SNK games
Video games developed in Japan